Allium drusorum is a plant species in the amaryllis family. It is endemic to Syria.

References

drusorum
Flora of Syria